!Hero is an album featuring the songs from the rock opera, !Hero. It is based on the question, "What if Jesus was born in Bethlehem, Pennsylvania?" The rock opera modernizes Jesus' last two years on earth and features a cast of many well-known Christian rock artists with Michael Tait, Rebecca St. James, and Mark Stuart as the three main characters: Hero (Jesus), Maggie (Mary Magdalene), and Petrov (Peter).

Track listing and performers

Reviews 
Chris Well, writing for CCM Magazine, reviewed it favorably and stated, "!Hero is inventive, rhythmic and should, no doubt, spark debate everywhere about the real Jesus.
On the other hand, Andree Farias of Christian Music Today, wrote, "!Hero's attempt to be all things to all people is well-intentioned, its 'replayability' value is minimal, deeming it no more than a glorified post-concert souvenir for the live stage show."

Primary cast 

 Michael Tait as Hero
 Mark Stuart of Audio Adrenaline as Petrov
 Rebecca St. James as Maggie
 Paul Wright as Special Agent Hunter
 Nirva Dorsaint as Mama Mary
 John Cooper of Skillet as Chief Rabbi Kai
 Michael Quinlan as Jude
 Matt Hammitt of Sanctus Real as blind cripple
 T-Bone as Jairus
 Donnie Lewis as Jairus' wife
 Pete Stewart as Chief of police Devlin
 Bob Farrell as Governor Pilate
 John Grey as Preacher Rabbi at the wedding
 Nathaniel Lee as Janitor Angel
 GRITS as the Wedding Party
 Pete and Donna Stewart as the bride and groom at the wedding

Secondary cast and musicians

 Todd Collins – percussion
 Eddie DeGarmo – piano, background vocals, executive producer
 DJ Maj – scratching
 Jason Eskridge – background vocals
 Kim Fleming – choir
 Brad Ford – vocals, assistant executive producer
 Robert Gay – children's chorus
 Rachel Goldstein – choir
 Kirk "Jelly Roll" Johnson – harmonica
 Tony Lucido – bass guitar
 Rick May – drums
 Ann McCrary – choir
 Antonio Phelon – choir, background vocals
 John Ray – choir
 Becky Robertson – children's chorus
 Joanna Robertson – children's chorus
 Thomas Romines – choir
 Pete Stewart – acoustic guitar, electric guitar, bass, piano, electric piano
 Greg Thomas – choir
 Patti Thomas – choir
 Michelle Valentine – choir
 Paul Wright III

Support staff

 Eddie DeGarmo – executive producer
 Brad Ford – assistant executive producer
 Carl Marsh – Fairlight, string arrangement
 Bethany Newman – art director, design
 Marcelo Pennell – audio engineer
 Carter Robertson – choir director
 Dan Shike – mastering
 Pete Stewart – audio engineer, producer, programming
 Greg Thomas – choir director

Notes

Footnotes

References
  
 
 
 
 
 

2003 albums
Rock operas
Contemporary Christian music albums
Depictions of Jesus in music
ForeFront Records albums
Concept albums
Collaborative albums